Best Akina Memoires is the first greatest hits album by Japanese singer Akina Nakamori. It was released on 21 December 1983 through Warner Pioneer. It was released on the same day as the first music home video New Akina Etranger in Europe. The album consists of all singles released during years 1982-1983 and small number of a popular album tracks.

Background
The album contains all the singles released between 1982 and 1983: from Nakamori's debut "Slow Motion" to her seventh single "Kinku".

The singles "½ no Shinwa", "Twilight (Yūgure Dayori)" and "Kinku" were recorded in the album for first time.

Promotion

Singles
"'½ no Shinwa" is the fourth single released on 23 February 1983. The single debuted at number 1 on Oricon Single Weekly Chart and became the 13th best sold single in 1983. In the Best Ten ranking, it debuted on number 1 and stayed at number 13 in the yearly chart.

It has received Pop Prize in the television music award Megapolis Festival

"Twilight (Yūgure Dayori)" is the fifth single released on 1 June 1983. The single debuted at number 2 on Oricon Single Weekly Chart and became the 19th best sold single in 1985. In the Best Ten ranking, it debuted on number 1 and stayed at number 27 in the yearly chart.

It has received Gold Dove Award in the 9th Nippon Television Music Festival.

"Kinku" is the sixth single released on 7 September 1983. Although it was never recorded in the album before, in the Music Home Video New Akina Etranger in Europe is recorded the recording footage of the single. The single debuted at number 1 on Oricon Single Weekly Chart and became the 17th best sold single in 1985. In the Best Ten ranking, it debuted on number 1 and stayed at number 10 in the yearly chart.

It has received six awards: Yokohama Music Festival Award in the 10th Yokohama Music Festival, Professional Jury Award in the 9th International Music Festival, Broadcast Music Award in the 14th Japan Music Awards, Golden Idol Award in the 25th Japan Record Awards, Cable Music Award and Most Requested Singer Award in the 16th Japan Cable Awards, Outstanding Star Award and Yomiuri TV Grand Prize in the 16th International Japan Cable Streaming Award.

Charting performance
The album debuted at number 1 on the Oricon Weekly Album Charts and remained in the same position for five consecutive weeks and charted for 24 weeks. The album remained at number 6 on the Oricon Album Yearly Charts in 1984. The album totally sold more than 700,000 copies.

Track listing
All tracks are arranged by Mitsuo Hagita, except where indicated.

References

1983 compilation albums
Akina Nakamori compilation albums
Warner Music Japan albums
Japanese-language compilation albums